When I Said I Wanted to Be Your Dog is the debut studio album by Swedish indie pop musician Jens Lekman. His first full-length, the album was released on 7 April 2004 on Service, and later in the year was also released on Secretly Canadian with a slightly altered track listing.

Track listing

Sample credits
"A Higher Power" contains samples of "So Catch Him" by Blueboy and "Words Don't Fail Me Now" by The Night Keys.

Personnel
Credits for When I Said I Wanted to Be Your Dog adapted from liner notes.

 Jens Lekman – writing, performance, recording, horn arrangements
Additional personnel

 Björn Almgren – saxophone
 Emma Bates – backing vocals
 Marcus Cato – trumpet
 Lars-Erik Grimelund – drums
 Ellen Hjalmarsson – violin
 Peter Noos Johansson – trombone
 Ulrika Mild – backing vocals

 Lilian Olsson – backing vocals
 Mikaela Robsahm – cello
 Stefan Sporsén – trumpet, althorn, horn arrangements
 Jacob Stålhammar – mastering
 Johan Strömberg – recording (horns and drums)
 Ben Swanson – drums

Charts

References

2004 debut albums
Jens Lekman albums
Secretly Canadian albums
Service (record label) albums